The Asturian bowling is the variation of bowling mainly played in Asturias, and the most important traditional sport in this Spanish Autonomous Community.

History
There are controversies about its origins. The most credible hypothesis talks about how pilgrims brought this tradition thanks to the Camino de Santiago.

Bowling is important in Asturian culture as it is mentioned in the Regional mythology, for example with the golden bowls of the xanes.

The first reference of Asturian bowling, one of the oldest in Spain, dates back to 1495. Alonso de Quintanilla, major book-keeper of the Catholic Monarchs, complains Nuno Bernaldo de Quirós of ruining the coat of arms during a bowling game at Campo de San Francisco in Oviedo. Thanks to this document, it is known that the pins were called byrlos and that betting was usual during the games.

In the 18th century, according to Gaspar Melchor de Jovellanos, in most villages and places of Asturias there's a bowling alley, a place where neighbors meet and play. During the 19th century and the early 20th, the Asturian bowling became the most widespread activity in the rural zones of the Region.

Asturian bowling popularity grows during the 20th century with the creation of a Federation, that was dissolved during the Spanish Civil War. When it finished, competitions were reorganized and the Asturian Federation of Bowling was reestablished in 1962.

Nowadays, due to the rural emigration, some bowling variations fell into disuse. Despite the emigration, the rise of interest in traditional culture is helping to keep the game, specially in the most played variations like cuatreada, birle or bolo celta.

Variations
Cuatreada: the most extended variation, mainly played in the center and the East of Asturias.
Birle or bolo palma: played in the Eastern Asturias and Cantabria.
Bolo batiente or batiente rodáu: played in the Western coast of Asturias.
Bolo of Tineo or bolo celta.
Bolo vaqueiro

See also
Bowling Museum of Asturias

References
 Catalogue of the Bowling Museum of Asturias
 García Acebal (E.): “Deportes” in Gran Enciclopedia Asturiana. Gijón, Silverio Cañada, 1981.
 Braun Trueba (J.): Bolos y cultura. Aportación al origen y desarrollo de los bolos de Cantabria. Santander, Artes Gráficas Resma, 1984.
 Ruiz Alonso (J. G.): Bolos asturianos. Modalidaes, téunica y estáu actual. Gijón, Alborá llibros ediciones, 1992.
 Ruiz Alonso (J. G.): Los bolos en Asturias. Gijón, Alborá Llibros Ediciones 2000.

External links
Asturian Bowling Federation website
Bowling Museum of Asturias website

Sport in Asturias
Traditional sports